Claude René Georges Blanchard (25 May 1945 – 9 July 2019) was a French ice hockey player. He competed in the men's tournament at the 1968 Winter Olympics.

His death was announced on 11 July 2019.

References

1945 births
2019 deaths
Ice hockey players at the 1968 Winter Olympics
Olympic ice hockey players of France
People from Vichy
Sportspeople from Allier